Henri Duveyrier (28 February 1840 – 25 April 1892) was a French explorer and geographer, known for his exploration of the Sahara.

Life
Duveyrier was born in Paris, the eldest child of Charles Duveyrier (1803–1866), a well-known dramatist, and his English wife Ellen Claire née Denie. Charles Duveyrier was a follower of the utopian philosophical movement started by Henri de Saint-Simon.
In 1857 and 1858, Duveyrier spent some months in London, where he met Heinrich Barth, then preparing an account of his travels in the western Sudan.

Duveyrier was Auguste Warnier's guest in 1857 at his home in Kandouri, a suburb of Algiers, where he met Oscar MacCarthy.
On 8 March 1857 Duveyrier and MacCarthy left on a five-week trip to Laghouat and back.
Duveyrier was fascinated by the Tuaregs he met on this trip and the next year gave an account of Tuareg customs to the Berlin Oriental Society.
Later Duveyrier made an unsuccessful attempt to reach Tuat, which was stopped by the Tuaregs at El Goléa.
Duveyrier left in May 1859 and after an exhausting journey returned to Warnier's house on 5 December 1861, emaciated and delirious with fever.
In 1864, two years after returning to France, he published Exploration du Sahara: les Touareg du nord (Exploration of the Sahara: Tuaregs of the North), for which he received the gold medal of the Paris Geographical Society.

In the Franco-Prussian War of 1870 he was taken prisoner by the Germans. After his release he made several further journeys in the Sahara, adding considerably to the knowledge of the regions immediately south of the Atlas Mountains, from the eastern confines of Morocco to Tunisia. He also examined the Algerian and Tunisian chotts and explored the interior of western Tripoli. Duveyrier devoted special attention to the customs and speech of the Tuareg people, with whom he lived for months at a time, and to the organization of the Senussi.

In 1881 he published La Tunisie, and in 1884 La confrérie musulmane de Sîdî Mohammed ben Alî-Senoûsi et son domaine géographique en l'année 1300 de l'Hégire.

Duveyrier was adversely affected by the tragedy that befell the Flatters Expedition of 1880–81 which put an end to the proposed Trans Sahara railway and military expansion in the region. Those who had dreamed of transforming the Tuareg into linemen for camel railway crossings blamed Duveyrier for their disappointment. Duveyrier's only error was in having described the Tuareg as veiled, turbaned medieval paladins; but the explorer was already shaken by the premature death of his fiancée, and embittered by the controversy, he committed suicide in 1892.

Works

References

Sources

Further reading

 
 
  The Introduction is available online.

External links
 

History of the Sahara
Explorers from Paris
1840 births
1892 deaths
Tuareg
Suicides in France
1890s suicides